Yang Jinlong (born January 1966) is a Chinese chemist currently serving as vice president of the University of Science and Technology of China.

Biography
Yang was born in the town of Xuefu, Yandu District of Yancheng, Jiangsu in January 1966. In 1981 he entered Nanjing Normal University, where he graduated in 1985. From 1985 to 1991, he studied at the University of Science and Technology of China (USTC), where he earned his master's and Ph.D. degrees.

Upon graduation, he joined the faculty of USTC. In 1996 he was promoted to professor. He became Dean of the School of Chemistry and Materials Science of USTC in 2009 and Vice President of USTC in May 2018.

Honours and awards
 November 22, 2019 Member of the Chinese Academy of Sciences (CAS)

References

1966 births
Scientists from Yancheng
Living people
Nanjing Normal University alumni
University of Science and Technology of China alumni
Chemists from Jiangsu
Members of the Chinese Academy of Sciences